Stop and Listen is the second album by American jazz organist Baby Face Willette featuring performances recorded and released on the Blue Note label in 1961. It features a version of the 1941 Harry Warren song "At Last," which at the time of the Stop and Listen recording sessions was on the R&B and Billboard Hot 100 record charts through Etta James' hit recording of the song.

Reception

The Allmusic review by Steve Huey awarded the album 4½ stars and stated "With Blue Note's extraordinary stable of talent, it's a shame that Willette never led another session for the label, which makes Stop and Listen that much more essential for soul-jazz fans".

Track listing
All compositions by Baby Face Willette except as indicated
 "Willow Weep for Me" (Ann Ronell) - 8:14
 "Chances Are Few" - 7:41
 "Jumpin' Jupiter" - 5:11
 "Stop and Listen" - 4:38
 "At Last" (Mack Gordon, Harry Warren) - 7:19
 "Soul Walk" - 5:23
 "Work Song" (Nat Adderley) - 4:53
 "They Can't Take That Away from Me" (George Gershwin, Ira Gershwin) - 6:24 Bonus track on CD reissue

Personnel
Baby Face Willette – organ
Grant Green – guitar
Ben Dixon – drums

References

Blue Note Records albums
Baby Face Willette albums
1961 albums
Albums produced by Alfred Lion
Albums recorded at Van Gelder Studio